Rachel Louise Corsie (born 17 August 1989) is a Scottish professional footballer who plays as a defender for Aston Villa W.F.C in the FA Women’s Super League (WSL). She is also the captain of the Scotland national team.

She previously played for Glasgow City in the Scottish Women's Premier League, English FA WSL club Notts County and Canberra United in the Australian W-League. Corsie made her senior national team debut against France in March 2009 and has since amassed over 100 appearances for the national team.

Club career

Glasgow City, 2008–2014
In July 2008 Corsie joined Glasgow City from Aberdeen Ladies at age 18. In her first season with City she contributed 10 goals as the club won a domestic treble. She also featured in the UEFA Women's Champions League.

In May 2012, Corsie made her 100th league appearance for Glasgow City. Of the milestone, Glasgow City head coach Eddie Wolecki Black said, "I think it shows remarkable consistently she has managed to rack up 100 starts for the club in such a short period of time. People tend to forget that Rachel is still only 22 years of age and is continuing to develop as a player."

Notts County, 2014
Corsie left Glasgow City for Notts County in January 2014, to fulfil her ambition of playing in England. She was attracted to playing at Meadow Lane and training full-time. In January 2015 it was announced by Notts County Ladies that Corsie had chosen not to continue with the club for their forthcoming season. After a successful year at Notts where she was captain throughout the season, she had also been awarded Supporters Player of the Season and joint Managers Player of the Season. Many fans rated Corsie as the best centre back of the 2014 season.

Seattle Reign FC, 2015–2017
Corsie signed with American side Seattle Reign FC for the 2015 season of the National Women's Soccer League in January 2015. Of her signing, Reign FC head coach Laura Harvey said, "Rachel is a terrific player who will bring depth and experience to our backline. She will make the entire defensive unit stronger by providing us flexibility we lacked last season. We are excited to have her with the club and know she will make an impact."

Corsie was released by Seattle in January 2018.

Loan to Glasgow City, 2015 
On 25 September Corsie re-joined Glasgow City on loan from Seattle Reign FC.

Utah Royals FC, Kansas City NWSL 2018–2021
On 19 March 2018, Corsie signed with Utah Royals FC. Corsie appeared in all 24 games for Utah in 2018. She was named to the NWSL Team of the Month in July.

Corsie returned to Utah for the 2019 NWSL season. She was named to the NWSL team of the Month for May. Corsie would miss several NWSL games due to her participation in the 2019 FIFA Women's World Cup. She scored her first goal for the Royals on 19 July, her goal in the 90th minute helped Utah earn a 2–2 draw against the Portland Thorns.  She moved with the team to Kansas City and was the captain before transferring to Aston Villa.

Loan to Canberra United
Corsie signed with Canberra United for the 2018-19 W-League season. Prior to the first game of the season, Corsie was named team captain. Corsie played every minute of the season for Canberra, as they finished the season in 8th place and did not qualify for the playoffs.

Loan to Birmingham City 
On 28 August 2020, Corsie signed on loan for Birmingham City until January 2021. She will miss the fall season of the National Women's Soccer League.

Aston Villa, 2022–Present 
On 27 January 2022, it was revealed that in December, Kansas City Current had released Corsie, who was informed a few days before Christmas by her agent. Aston Villa agreed to sign her.

International career
Corsie captained the Scotland U-19 team to the finals of the 2008 UEFA Women's Under-19 Championship. At the 2009 Cyprus Cup, Corsie made her senior debut against France and was selected in all Scotland's games at the tournament.

As of January 2015, Corsie has earned over 70 caps for the senior national team and has scored 13 goals playing primarily in the central defender position. She scored three goals during the 2011 FIFA Women's World Cup qualification. In March 2011, Corsie captained the team to a 2–0 win over England at the 2011 Cyprus Cup, a first for Scotland in more than 30 years.

Corsie scored four goals for Scotland during UEFA qualifying for the 2015 FIFA Women's World Cup. Scotland finished second in their qualifying group and advanced to the UEFA play-offs where they were eliminated by the Netherlands.

In 2017 Scotland qualified for the European Championships for the first time ever. Corsie was named to the Scotland Team for Euro 2017 and appeared in all three group games for Scotland. On 10 September 2017, Corsie was named the new captain of the Scotland Women's National Team following the retirement of Gemma Fay.

Corsie made her 100th international appearance on 12 June 2018, in a 2019 World Cup qualifier against Poland. Scotland won their qualifying group and qualified for the World Cup for the first time ever.

Corsie made her World Cup debut at the 2019 World Cup. She played every minute of Scotland's three group games. Scotland suffered two consecutive 2–1 losses to start the World Cup. In their third group match against Argentina, Scotland was leading 3–0 in the 70th minute before giving up three unanswered goals. The game would finish in a 3–3 draw eliminating Scotland's chances of advancing to the knockout round.

International goals

Personal life
Corsie's great-grandfather was Aberdeen FC legend Donald Colman. Corsie remains an Aberdeen FC supporter and models her game on that of Zander Diamond.

Corsie works in professional services at Ernst & Young as an Assurance Associate where her flexible working scheme enables her to do accountancy and football side by side. She studied at Hazlehead Academy and then undertook a degree in accountancy and finance at Robert Gordon University. Corsie was awarded a women's football scholarship by the SFA.

Corsie is engaged to Scottish squash player Lisa Aitken.

Honours

Club
Glasgow City
Scottish Women's Premier League: 2008–09, 2009, 2010, 2011, 2012, 2013, 2015
Scottish Women's Cup: 2009, 2011, 2012, 2013, 2015
Scottish Women's Premier League Cup: 2008–09, 2009, 2012, 2013
Seattle Reign
 NWSL Shield: 2015

Individual
 Kat Lindner Award for Outstanding Academic and Athletic Achievement (SWF Awards): 2019

See also

 List of foreign NWSL players
 List of association football families
 List of women's footballers with 100 or more caps
 Scottish FA Women's International Roll of Honour

References

External links

 
 
 Seattle Reign FC player profile
 Glasgow City player profile
 Rachel Corsie: Two out of two
 

1989 births
Living people
Scottish women's footballers
Scotland women's international footballers
Glasgow City F.C. players
Notts County L.F.C. players
Footballers from Aberdeen
OL Reign players
National Women's Soccer League players
Scottish Women's Premier League players
Utah Royals FC players
FIFA Century Club
Women's association football central defenders
Scottish expatriate women's footballers
Expatriate women's soccer players in the United States
2019 FIFA Women's World Cup players
People educated at Hazlehead Academy
LGBT association football players
Scottish LGBT sportspeople
Birmingham City W.F.C. players
Kansas City Current players
Aberdeen F.C. Women players
UEFA Women's Euro 2017 players
Aston Villa W.F.C. players